Curtis Valk (born February 8, 1993) is a Canadian-Kazakhstani professional ice hockey centre. He is currently playing with Avtomobilist Yekaterinburg in the Kontinental Hockey League (KHL). He has formerly played in the National Hockey League (NHL) with the Florida Panthers.

Playing career
Valk played major junior hockey for his hometown team, the Medicine Hat Tigers in the Western Hockey League (WHL). Valk, who played in the WHL from the 2010–11 season, was rewarded for his outstanding performance during the 2012–13 WHL season by being named to the 2013 WHL East First All-Star Team.

As an undrafted free agent embarking on his first professional season, Valk was invited to participate in the Vancouver Canucks 2014 training camp on September 21, 2014. He was later demoted to AHL affiliate, the Utica Comets, where he signed a one-year contract on October 10, 2014. He was immediately re-assigned to ECHL affiliate, the Kalamazoo Wings to begin the 2014–15 season.

On July 1, 2017, Valk signed as a free agent to a one-year, entry-level contract with the Florida Panthers. During training camp, Valk was re-assigned by the Panthers to begin the 2017–18 season with AHL affiliate, the Springfield Thunderbirds. Through the first 16 games of the season, Valk impressed to lead the team in scoring with 15 points. On November 13, 2017, he received his first recall by the Panthers to the NHL, and made his NHL debut on November 14, 2017. After a solitary game with the Panthers, Valk was returned to the Thunderbirds and played out the season in collecting a career best 62 points in 73 games.

As a restricted free agent with the Panthers, Valk opted to pause his North American career in signing a one-year contract with Kazahkstani club, Barys Astana of the KHL on July 3, 2018.

Following four seasons with Barys, Valk as a dual Kazakhstani citizen left to sign a two-year contract to continue in the KHL with Avtomobilist Yekaterinburg on May 1, 2022.

Career statistics

Regular season and playoffs

International

Awards and honours

References

External links

1993 births
Living people
Avtomobilist Yekaterinburg players
Barys Nur-Sultan players
Brooks Bandits players
Canadian ice hockey centres
Florida Panthers players
Kalamazoo Wings (ECHL) players
Medicine Hat Tigers players
Springfield Thunderbirds players
Undrafted National Hockey League players
Utica Comets players
Ice hockey people from Alberta
Naturalised citizens of Kazakhstan
Kazakhstani ice hockey centres
Sportspeople from Medicine Hat
Kazakhstani people of Canadian descent